João Félix Sequeira (born 10 November 1999) is a Portuguese professional footballer who plays as a forward for Premier League club Chelsea, on loan from Atlético Madrid of La Liga, and the Portugal national team. He can also play as a winger or an attacking midfielder.

Félix initially trained at Porto's youth academy, before moving to rivals Benfica in 2015. He began playing for the latter's reserve team a year later and was promoted to the first team in 2018, making his debut at age 17. He helped Benfica win the league title in his first and only season with them, and was awarded Primeira Liga's Best Young Player of the Year and the Golden Boy award. In 2019, at age 19, Félix signed with Atlético Madrid for a club-record transfer worth €126 million (£113 million), the fourth-most expensive football transfer, the second-most paid for a teenager, and the highest fee for a Portuguese player leaving the domestic league. In his second season at the club, he helped the team win the 2020–21 La Liga, which ended the club's seven-year league title drought.

Félix is a former Portugal youth international, representing his country at under-18, under-19, and under-21 levels. He earned his first cap for the senior national team during the semi-finals of the 2019 UEFA Nations League Finals, winning the inaugural edition of the competition with his nation on home soil.

Club career

Early career
Félix started playing football at Os Pestinhas in 2007 before joining the youth ranks of FC Porto a year later at age eight. After Félix moved to Porto, he faced challenges such as extensive schedules including daily shuttle hours between Viseu and Porto. He moved out of his parents' house at age 12 to live near Porto's youth training grounds; in a later interview, Félix revealed that during this time he considered quitting football due to the lack of playing time, but his father convinced him to pursue his career. Félix was released by Porto in 2014 because of his slight frame (Félix denies these claims and says he left of his own volition) and moved to Lisbon rivals Benfica in 2015, at age 15, after a season-long loan at Padroense.

Benfica

2016–2018: Youth career
Félix debuted professionally at age 16 for Benfica's reserve team in LigaPro on 17 September 2016, as an 83rd-minute substitute for Aurélio Buta in a goalless draw at Freamunde. At the time, he was the youngest player to debut for Benfica B, a record  since been broken by Cher Ndour in May 2021. He played 13 matches and scored three goals over the season, the first being a consolation in a 2–1 loss to his hometown team Académico de Viseu on 15 February 2017. Later, on 30 January 2018, he scored a hat-trick in a 5–0 home win over Famalicão. During that season, Félix played in the 2016–17 UEFA Youth League, in which he was a key part of Benfica reaching the final of the competition, which it lost to Red Bull Salzburg (2–1), scoring six goals in the tournament.

2018–19: Rise to the first team and league title
Félix was promoted to Benfica's first team for the 2018–19 season, making his debut in a 2–0 Primeira Liga win at Boavista on 18 August. A week later, he scored his first Primeira Liga goal, thus becoming the youngest player to score in the Lisbon derby, which ended in a 1–1 tie. On 16 January 2019, he scored the qualifying goal against Vitória de Guimarães in the Portuguese Cup quarter-finals. After Bruno Lage took over as coach of Benfica, his first decision was to use Félix more regularly, partnering him with Haris Seferovic in the attack, taking advantage of the bad run of Facundo Ferreyra and Nicolás Castillo and the injury of Jonas. Later on, Félix was praised for his performance in a 4–2 away win over Sporting CP in the league on 3 February, subsequently sparking interest from several European clubs. A month later, he scored the equaliser in a 2–1 away win over Porto in the league.

On 11 April 2019, Félix scored a hat-trick in a 4–2 UEFA Europa League win over Eintracht Frankfurt. In doing so, he became the youngest ever player (aged 19 years and 152 days) to score a hat-trick in the competition, breaking Marko Pjaca's record by 67 days. Félix finished his first season with 20 goals for his team, including one on the final day of the league campaign, in a 4–1 win over Santa Clara to seal the title; his 15 league goals put him joint-fourth for the season. Across Europe's seven best leagues, he ranked second among teenagers for goals and assists, behind Kai Havertz and Jadon Sancho, respectively.

Atlético Madrid

2019–20: Debut season
On 3 July 2019, Félix signed a seven-year contract with Spanish club Atlético Madrid for a transfer fee of €126 million (£113 million), the fourth highest sum ever paid in football (this was also Benfica's biggest transfer and Atlético's most expensive signing ever) as well as the second highest fee ever paid for a teenager (after Kylian Mbappé), with the Spanish club initially paying €30 million and the rest €96 million via instalments, thus surpassing Félix's €120 million buyout clause, and with Benfica paying €12 million in mediation services. Upon his arrival to the club he was handed the number 7 shirt previously worn by Antoine Griezmann, who had departed to Barcelona.

Félix made his competitive debut on 19 August 2019, in a 1–0 victory over Getafe. Despite not scoring a goal, he managed to win a penalty for Atlético after being fouled inside the box which Álvaro Morata subsequently failed to convert. On 25 August, Félix provided an assist for Vitolo in a 1–0 away win against Leganés. He scored his first La Liga goal on 1 September, in a 3–2 victory over Eibar; he was later substituted in the 84th minute for Thomas Partey. On 1 October, Félix scored his first UEFA Champions League goal and set up another goal in a 2–0 away victory against Lokomotiv Moscow, becoming the youngest goalscorer for Atlético Madrid in the competition in the process, at 19 years of age.

On 19 October, Félix suffered an ankle injury against Valencia, after a rash challenge by Dani Parejo, leaving his team with only ten men on the pitch, as his coach Diego Simeone had already made the maximum number of allowed substitutions. Initially, Simeone thought that Félix's injury was not too serious, until the club's medical team revealed that the ankle injury could be severe, leading him to be sidelined for one month. Félix made his return on 23 November in a 1–1 away draw against Granada. During this time, Félix was one of the 30 candidates who was nominated for the 2019 Ballon d'Or.

On 27 November 2019, Félix became the second Portuguese player, after Renato Sanches, to win the Golden Boy award for the best player in Europe under the age of 21, ahead of Borussia Dortmund's Jadon Sancho. In December, Félix placed 28th place in the voting polls for the 2019 Ballon d'Or.

Over the following months, Félix started to have difficulties in adapting to Diego Simeone's playing style, with Simeone trying to find his ideal position either as a right winger or second striker; he also struggled with the fact that the forwards under Simeone were expected to press their opponents frequently when playing off the ball, which often left him drained during match, while when in possession, he was also unable to create scoring chances, leading Spanish newspaper Marca to name him one of the most disappointing transfers of the season.

On 9 January 2020, Félix made his debut in the Supercopa de España, starting in a 3–2 victory against Barcelona in the semi-finals of the competition. During the match, Félix was involved in an altercation with Jordi Alba and his teammates Lionel Messi and Luis Suárez. On 12 January, Atlético Madrid lost to their rivals Real Madrid 4–1 on penalties in the final. On 23 January, Félix made his Copa del Rey debut in the Round of 32, providing an assist for Ángel Correa in a 2–1 loss against Cultural Leonesa. Three days later, Félix suffered a second injury to his leg in a 0–0 home draw against Leganés, sidelining him once again for a month, and leading him to miss to Atlético Madrid's next three league matches, which included the second Madrid derby of the season and Atlético Madrid's first leg of their Champions League round of 16 tie against defending champions Liverpool. He made his return on 23 February, replacing Vitolo in the 57th minute, and scoring the third goal in a 3–1 home victory against Villarreal.

On 11 March 2020, during extra time in the second leg of Atlético's tie against Liverpool, Félix provided an assist for Marcos Llorente in an eventual 3–2 away win, which saw his team qualify to the quarter-finals of the competition. On 25 May, it was announced that Félix had suffered an injury on his left knee, requiring him to be sidelined for at least three weeks. On 13 August, Félix was substituted on in the second half against RB Leipzig in the Champions League quarter-finals, winning and converting a penalty to equalise for Atlético; the match would end in a 1–2 defeat that saw his side exit the competition.

2020–21: First La Liga title and injury struggles
On 27 September 2020, in Atlético's La Liga opening fixture, Félix scored, provided an assist and managed to win a penalty for his side after being fouled inside the box (which Saúl Ñíguez subsequently failed to convert), in Atlético's 6–1 win against Granada. On 27 October, he scored a brace in a 3–2 win over Red Bull Salzburg in the 2020–21 UEFA Champions League group stage. Following back-to-back braces against Osasuna and Cádiz in La Liga, he was named the league's Player of the Month for November 2020. On 1 December, Félix scored against European champions Bayern Munich as his side drew 1–1. On 24 January 2021, he headed in a corner to equalise for Atlético in their 3–1 win over Valencia, scoring his first league goal in over two months. He was infected with COVID-19 in February, which forced him to miss Atlético's next fixtures against Celta Vigo and Granada. He returned on 17 February, appearing in a 1–1 away draw against Levante.

On 16 May, the penultimate matchday of the La Liga season, Félix provided a crucial assist to Renan Lodi of his side's 2–1 comeback victory over Osasuna, to ensure that Atlético would remain on top of the table. Due to a succession of injuries and lack of game time, Félix lost his starting place in attack to Ángel Correa, Luis Suárez, Thomas Lemar, and Yannick Carrasco, as he had been playing since November with an injury. At the end of the season, he had made 31 league appearances, scoring 7 goals and providing 6 assists, as Atletico won their first La Liga title in seven years.

2021–22: Breakthrough and Atlético's Player of the Season

Félix missed Atlético's first three matches of the 2021–22 season, as he continued to rehabilitate from the ankle injury he had been suffering since November. He made his return from injury on 12 September, replacing Antoine Griezmann in the 58th minute in a 2–1 away victory against Espanyol. On 18 September, Félix was sent off in the 78th minute in a 0–0 home draw against Athletic Bilbao, for calling the referee "crazy", leading him to receive a two-match ban. Félix began regaining his place in the team, following his performances in Atlético's next three matches, creating both of Atlético goals, in a 2–0 home victory in La Liga against Barcelona on 2 October, as well assisting Antoine Griezmann second goal in a 2–3 home defeat against Liverpool in the Champions League on 19 October and assisting Luis Suárez first goal in a 2–2 home draw against Real Sociedad in La Liga on 24 October. He would score his first goal of the season on 31 October, in a 3–0 home win against Real Betis. For his performances in October, Félix was awarded Atlético Madrid Player of the Month by the club's supporters.

After suffering a hamstring injury following a league against Osasuna on 20 November, Félix began falling out with manager Diego Simeone, losing his place as a starter. This would lead to him being rumoured to a potential departure for the club in January, which Atlético Madrid's president Enrique Cerezo dismissed. Despite impressing in the 2–0 loss to rivals Real Madrid in the Madrid derby, after coming from the bench, on 17 December manager Diego Simeone stated that he was an "important player for the team, but "anything can happen" in January. He would be given an opportunity from the manager in the starting line against Granada on 22 December, scoring a goal and having another disallowed in a 2–1 loss.

On 19 February 2022, Félix made his 100th appearance for the club, opening the scoring and provided an assist in Atletico's 3–0 away win over Osasuna. The following match, on 23 February, Félix scored Atlético's opening goal in a 1–1 home draw over Manchester United at the first leg of Champions League round-of-16 tie. In the reverse fixture, on 15 March, Félix created Renan Lodi's goal, which was assisted by Antoine Griezmann, to help Atlético defeat Manchester United 1–0 at Old Trafford and qualify to the quarter-finals, securing a 2–1 aggregate win. The following six matches, after scoring six goals and providing two assists, Félix was awarded in March, the league's Player of the Month award. On 17 April, during a match against Espanyol, Félix suffered a hamstring injury, ruling him out for the remainder of the season. At the end of the season, Félix was awarded Atlético Madrid's Player of the Season award, named by the club's supporters, after finishing the campaign with 10 goals and 6 assists.

2022–23: Relationship with Diego Simeone
Félix started the 2022–23 season, on 15 August, providing a hat-trick of assists for the first time in his career as Atlético beat Getafe 3–0 away from home. In the process, he became the third Portuguese player to provide three assists in a match in La Liga. The following matches were preceded by a dispute over Félix's relationship with Diego Simeone, where Félix lost his place in the starting line-up and became the club's fifth choice attacker behind Ángel Correa, Antoine Griezmann, Alvaro Morata and Matheus Cunha. His relationship with his manager deteriorated further on 10 October, during a Champions League group stage match against Club Brugge, where in the second half of the match, Simeone sent him to warm up three times, only to leave him on the bench. Afterwards, he proceeded to ask his agent Jorge Mendes to find him a new club in the winter transfer window, with this episode sparking his desire to leave the club. After featuring sporadically for Atlético in the following matches, Félix came on as a 60th-minute substitute and scored his first two goals of the season on 29 October, as he was named man of the match in a 3–2 away loss to Cádiz.

During the 2022 FIFA World Cup, on 6 December, Atlético's CEO Miguel Ángel Gil Marín confirmed the club's intention to sell Félix stating that "Félix is the biggest bet the club has ever made. I think he's a high-performance player, one of the best in the world, but, for reasons that it's not worth naming now, the relationship between him and the coach is not good, nor is his motivation. I would love for it to continue, but that is not the player's intention."

Loan to Chelsea
On 11 January 2023, Félix joined Premier League club Chelsea on loan for the remainder of the 2022–23 season, extending his contract with Atlético to 2027 before the move. He made his debut the following day in a 2–1 defeat away to Fulham, in which he was sent off in the 58th minute for a tackle on Kenny Tete, later receiving a three-match ban. Returning after suspension on 11 February, Félix scored his first goal for the club in a 1–1 league draw at West Ham United.

International career

Youth
On 14 June 2017, Félix began his international career with Portugal's under-18 team, debuting against Norway, replacing Elves Baldé in the 58th minute. In this friendly match, Félix scored a brace in a 3–0 victory in Lisbon. On 10 October 2017, Félix debuted for Portugal's under-21 team for the qualification of the 2019 UEFA European Under-21 Championship, in a 3–1 defeat against Bosnia and Herzegovina, replacing Xadas in the 56th minute.

On 15 January 2018, Félix debuted for Portugal's under-19 team as a 27th-minute substitute for an injured Jorge Teixeira in a 2–1 win over Turkey. On 23 March 2018, Félix scored his first international goal for Portugal's under-21 team in a 7–0 win over Liechtenstein. In the end of the qualification process, he had scored four goals, helping guide Portugal to the play-offs. In the first leg of the play-offs, Portugal faced Poland in a 1–0 away victory, but eventually lost in the second leg in a 3–1 home defeat, failing to qualify for the tournament.

During his international youth career, Félix would go on to represent the under-18, under-19 and under-21 teams, amassing 14 youth caps and scoring 6 goals overall.

Senior
On 15 March 2019, manager Fernando Santos called up Félix to the senior team for the first time, ahead of the opening UEFA Euro 2020 qualifying matches. During training with the national squad, Félix injured his foot and thus missed Portugal's match against Serbia on 25 March.

Félix was also selected for the 2019 UEFA Nations League Finals squad on home soil. He made his international debut for the senior team on 5 June against Switzerland in the semi-finals, where he was substituted in the 71st minute of a 3–1 win. Four days later, Portugal defeated Netherlands 1–0 in the tournament's final. He scored his first international goal on 5 September 2020 in a 4–1 home win over Croatia in the 2020–21 UEFA Nations League. Félix was selected for UEFA Euro 2020, replacing João Moutinho in the 55th minute in a 1–0 loss to Belgium in the round of 16 on 27 June.

In October 2022, he was named in Portugal's preliminary 55-man squad for the 2022 FIFA World Cup in Qatar, being included in the final 26-man squad for the tournament. On 25 November, Félix scored his first World Cup goal in Portugal's 3–2 group stage win against Ghana. On 6 December, Félix provided two assists in Portugal's 6–1 win over Switzerland in the round of 16. Portugal were eliminated in the quarter-finals after losing 1–0 to Morocco, who became the first CAF nation ever to reach the World Cup semi-finals.

Player profile

Style of play

Félix is regarded as a highly skilful and technical player capable of playing in several offensive positions, due to his versatility; throughout his career, he has been deployed as a striker, as a second striker, or even as a winger, although his primary position is that of an attacking midfielder. With Benfica, Félix usually played as a second striker in a 4–4–2 formation, where he was tasked with linking up the midfield with the attack, as well as creating opportunities for the team's main striker, while also being given the freedom to make runs into the box and score goals himself. With Atlético Madrid, he has occasionally played in a similar role, but has often been deployed as a winger on either flanks or the second striker in the team's 4–4–2 formation. A technical gifted and intelligent player, with an eye for goal, his primary traits are his creativity, finishing, touch on the ball, and dribbling skills, as well as his vision and precise passing.

Reception
Considered by Benfica to be one of the most promising players to have emerged from their youth ranks, Félix is also regarded by pundits as one of the most talented young players in world football. His playing style has led him to be compared to Brazilian former playmaker Kaká and former Benfica players Rui Costa and João Pinto; he has also been likened by some in the media to compatriot Cristiano Ronaldo, as well as former Atlético Madrid forwards Sergio Agüero and Antoine Griezmann.

Regarding Félix's playing style in 2019, Rui Costa praised the youngster for his "understanding of the game," and his "ability to know where to be in front of goal." João Tralhão, his former youth coach at Benfica, praising Félix's versatility said, "He can play anywhere [in attack], because he always finds the spaces to do what the coach wants. He understands that positioning like few in the world, he's very clever."

Personal life
Félix was born in Viseu. His parents, Carlos and Carla, are both teachers. He has a younger brother, Hugo, who plays for Benfica's youth ranks. Growing up, Félix's idols were Kaká and Rui Costa, the latter a player he looked to emulate. Félix is in a relationship with Portuguese actress Margarida Corceiro.

In April 2020, Félix made a donation of equipment to a crowdfunding campaign to a hospital in his hometown in Viseu during the COVID-19 pandemic.

Career statistics

Club

International

Scores and results list Portugal's goal tally first, score column indicates score after each Félix goal

Honours
Benfica
Primeira Liga: 2018–19

Atletico Madrid
La Liga: 2020–21

Portugal
UEFA Nations League: 2018–19

Individual
Atlético Madrid Player of the Year: 2021–22
Atlético Madrid Player of the Month: October 2021, December 2021
Primeira Liga Player of the Month: January 2019
SJPF Young Player of the Month: January 2019
UEFA Europa League Squad of the Season: 2018–19
CNID Best Revelation Footballer of the Year: 2019
Primeira Liga Best Young Player of the Year: 2018–19
Golden Globes: 2019 Best Newcomer
A Bola Player of the Year: 2019 
Golden Boy: 2019
Globe Revelation Player: 2019
La Liga Player of the Month: November 2020, March 2022

Notes

References

External links

Profile at the Chelsea F.C. website

1999 births
Living people
People from Viseu
Sportspeople from Viseu District
Portuguese footballers
Association football midfielders
Association football forwards
FC Porto players
Padroense F.C. players
S.L. Benfica B players
S.L. Benfica footballers
Atlético Madrid footballers
Chelsea F.C. players
Liga Portugal 2 players
Primeira Liga players
La Liga players
Premier League players
Portugal youth international footballers
Portugal under-21 international footballers
Portugal international footballers
UEFA Euro 2020 players
2022 FIFA World Cup players
UEFA Nations League-winning players
Golden Boy winners
Golden Globes (Portugal) winners
Portuguese expatriate footballers
Expatriate footballers in England
Expatriate footballers in Spain
Portuguese expatriate sportspeople in England
Portuguese expatriate sportspeople in Spain